Edmonton Public Schools (legally Edmonton School Division) is the largest public school division in Edmonton, the second largest in Alberta, and the sixth largest in Canada. The division offers a variety of alternative and special needs programs, and many are offered in multiple locations to improve accessibility for students. As a public school division, Edmonton Public Schools accepts all students who meet age and residency requirements set out in provincial legislation.

Size
Edmonton Public Schools operates 212 schools. There are a total of 124 elementary schools, 38 elementary/junior high schools, 5 elementary/junior/senior high schools, 26 junior high schools, 4 junior/senior highs, 15 senior high schools, and 7 other educational services offered. Approximately 105,000 students attend Edmonton Public Schools and there are over 9,700 full-time staff equivalencies. The proposed operating budget is $1.21 billion for the 2021–2022 fiscal year.

Governance

A group of nine elected trustees sit on the board of trustees for Edmonton Public Schools. Each trustee represents one ward in the city. They are elected every four years, in the regular municipal election. In the election, Edmonton voters can only vote for a trustee to one (not both) of the two main school boards. The last election was held on October 18, 2021. The public and Catholic systems operate independently of each other, and are both under the direct authority of the provincial government of Alberta.

History
Edmonton's first schoolhouse was built in 1881 in the Saskatchewan River valley and was in use as a school until 1904. The wooden-frame building was the first free public school in Alberta, and sometimes served as a courthouse and meeting hall. The school building was restored as an Edmonton Public Schools' centennial project in 1982, and has been moved to the grounds of the former McKay Avenue School (now the Edmonton Public Schools Archives and Museum). It is a Provincial Historic Resource.

Edmonton Public Schools Archives and Museum
Edmonton Public Schools Archives and Museum is located in historic McKay Avenue School. The building's cornerstone was laid in 1904 by the Governor General of Canada, Lord Minto. The year 1904 marked the beginning of an important new era of growth and prosperity in Alberta, and the building was designed to reflect this importance and inspire awe and grandeur. The design included unique features such as the Ionic Romanesque pillared entranceways.

McKay Avenue School served as the site of the first two sessions of the Alberta Legislature (1906 and 1907). It was in the third floor Assembly Hall that the important decision was made to make Edmonton the capital of Alberta.

McKay Avenue School was designated a Provincial Historic Resource in 1976. The venerable brick building had played an important role in the educational, social and political development of Edmonton and Alberta, but when in 1983 the enrollment fell to a low of 59 students the school was closed. At that time, in recognition of its importance in the early history of Edmonton and of Alberta, a history-conscious school board made a momentous decision:McKay Avenue School would be preserved to reflect the school district's past and to pass its history on to future generations.

Site-Based Decision Making
Edmonton Public Schools pioneered the concept of site-based decision making (decentralization) in Canada. Site-based decision making gives principals, who are ultimately responsible for everything that goes on in their schools, the authority, the financial resources and the flexibility to make decisions based on the individual needs of their schools.

In 1976, the district initiated a pilot project in seven of its schools and in 1980 had expanded the concept to all of its schools. This initiative has led to Edmonton Public offering an innovative school of choice model in which students have more options as to what school they want to attend to suit their interests, and has led to the creation of many very successful alternative programs such as Vimy Ridge Academy, Old Scona Academic and Victoria School of the Arts. The Edmonton Society for Christian Education and Millwoods Christian School (not part of the former) used to be private schools; however, have both also become part of Edmonton Public Schools as alternative programs.

Today, school-based management is functioning successfully in other educational jurisdictions across Canada.

Schools
Edmonton Public Schools' of continuum grades are commonly found in two grade level groupings: kindergarten through grade six being Elementary and grades 7 through 12 being Secondary. Further, Secondary grade groupings can be broken into Junior High (7-9) and Senior High (10-12) schools. However, there are certain schools that include more than one grade level grouping or don't conform to the grouping system.

Elementary schools

Elementary Schools offer instruction from kindergarten to grade six, unless otherwise noted.

Abbott School
Aldergrove School
Aleda Patterson School (K–3)
Athlone School
Bannerman School
Baturyn School
Beacon Heights School
Belgravia School
Belmead School
Belmont School
Belvedere School
Bisset School
Brander Gardens School
Brightview School
Brookside School
Caernarvon School
Calder School
Callingwood School
Centennial School
Clara Tyner School
Constable Daniel Woodall School
Coronation School
Crawford Plains School
Daly Grove School
Delton School
Delwood School
Donnan School
Dovercourt School
Duggan School
Dunluce School
Earl Buxton School
Ekota School
Elmwood School
Evansdale School
Forest Heights School
Fraser School
Garneau School
George H. Luck School
George P. Nicholson School
Glengarry School
Glenora School
Gold Bar School
Grace Martin School
Greenfield School
Greenview School
Grovenor School
Hazeldean School
Hillview School
Holyrood School
Homesteader School
Horse Hill School
Inglewood School
J. A. Fife School
Jackson Heights School
James Gibbons School
John A. McDougall School
John Barnett School
Julia Kiniski School
Kameyosek School
Keheewin School
Kildare School
King Edward School
Kirkness School
Lago Lindo School
Lansdowne School
LaPerle School
Lauderdale School
Lee Ridge School
Lendrum School
Lorelei School
Lymburn School
Lynnwood School
Malcolm Tweddle School
Malmo School
Mayfield School
McArthur School
McKee School
McLeod School
Meadowlark School
Mee-Yah-Noh School
Menisa School
Meyokumin School
Meyonohk School
Michael A. Kostek School
Mill Creek School
Minchau School
McKee School
Mount Pleasant School
Northmount School
Norwood School
Ormsby School
Overlanders School
Parkallen School
Patricia Heights School
Pollard Meadows School
Prince Charles School
Princeton School
Queen Alexandra School
Richard Secord School
Rideau Park School
Rio Terrace School
Riverdale School
Roberta MacAdams School
Rutherford School
Sakaw School
Satoo School
Scott Robertson School
Sifton School
Soraya Hafez School 
Steinhauer School
Sweet Grass School
Thorncliffe School
Tipaskan School
Velma E. Baker School
Virginia Park School
Waverley School
Weinlos School
Westbrook School
Westglen School
Windsor Park School
Winterburn School
York School
Youngstown School

Junior high schools
Junior high Schools offer instruction from grades seven to nine, unless otherwise noted.
Allendale School
Avalon School
Britannia School
D. S. MacKenzie School
Dan Knott School (To be renamed pending further consultation with stakeholders.)
Dickinsfield School
Edith Rogers School

Hillcrest School
John D. Bracco School
Kate Chegwin School
Kenilworth School
Killarney School
Londonderry School
Mary Butterworth School
Michael Phair School
Ottewell School
Riverbend School
Rosslyn School
S. Bruce Smith School
Spruce Avenue School
Steele Heights School
Thelma Chalifoux School
T. D. Baker School
Vernon Barford School
Westminster School
Westmount School

Senior High Schools
Senior High Schools offer instruction for grades ten, eleven and twelve, and offer 10, 20 and 30 level courses, unless otherwise noted.
Centre High Campus (12 only)
Dr. Anne Anderson High School
Eastglen School
Edmonton Christian High School
Harry Ainlay School
J. Percy Page School
Jasper Place School
Lillian Osborne School
M. E. LaZerte School
McNally School
Metro Continuing Education (various sites)
Old Scona School
Queen Elizabeth High School
Ross Sheppard School
Strathcona High School
W. P. Wagner School

Combined Schools

Combined Elementary/Junior High Schools
Combined Elementary/Junior High Schools offer instruction from kindergarten through grade nine, unless otherwise noted.
A. Blair McPherson School 
Alex Janvier School (4–9)
Balwin School 
Bessie Nichols School 
Crestwood School 
David Thomas King School 
Donald R. Getty School 
Dr. Donald Massey School 
Dr. Lila Fahlman School 
Dr. Margaret-Ann Armour School 
Edmonton Christian Northeast School 
Edmonton Christian West School 
Elizabeth Finch School 
Ellerslie Campus School 
Esther Starkman School 
Florence Hallock School 
Garth Worthington School
Grandview Heights School (1–9)
Hardisty School 
Highlands School
Hilwie Hamdon School
Ivor Dent School 
Jan Reimer School
Joey Moss School (K–7)
Johnny Bright School
Kensington School (K–7)
Kim Hung School 
Laurier Heights School
Major General Griesbach School 
McKernan School 
Meadowlark Christian School
Michael Strembitsky School 
Nellie Carlson School
Oliver School (To be renamed pending change of name of the surrounding Oliver neighbourhood.)
Parkview School
Shauna May Seneca School 
Stratford School 
Svend Hansen School 
Talmud Torah School

Secondary schools
Secondary Schools (combined Junior/Senior High) offer instruction from grade seven through twelve, and offer 10, 20 and 30 level courses, unless otherwise noted.
Amiskwaciy Academy 
Braemar School (8–12)
L. Y. Cairns School
Vimy Ridge Academy

Combined Elementary/Secondary Schools
Combined Elementary/Secondary Schools offer instruction in all grade levels from kindergarten to grade twelve, and offer 10, 20 and 30 level courses, unless otherwise noted.
Academy at King Edward  (2–12)
Alberta School for the Deaf (1–12)
Argyll Centre 
Millwoods Christian School
Victoria School of the Arts

Other schools
The Learning Stores are flexible-schedule store front operations for students who are returning to school or upgrading, and the Tevie Miller Heritage School is for students with diagnosed speech and language delays, disorders or disabilities.
Learning Store at Blue Quill (7–12)
Learning Store at Northgate (10–12)
Learning Store on Whyte (10–12)
Learning Store West Edmonton (10–12)
Tevie Miller Heritage School Program (1–6)

Closed Schools
Alex Taylor School (leased by Edmonton City Centre Church Corporation)
Bellevue Elementary School (now Al Mustafa Northside)
Bennett Centre (educational field trip destination for Alberta schools, offering overnight school programs, day programs, environmental lessons and outdoor activities since 1981)
Capilano School (now Suzuki Charter School Society)
Donald Ross School (houses decentralized Edmonton Public Schools staff)
Eastwood School (now used by Alberta Justice and Solicitor General as a training centre)
Fulton Place School (leased by multiple tenants including Fulton Child Care Association/Fulton Out-of-School Care Association)
Idylwylde School (vacant - not available for use)
Lawton School (utilized by Edmonton Police Services on a short-term basis)
McCauley School (leased by the City of Edmonton)
McKay Avenue School (now Edmonton Public Schools' Archives and Museum)
Mont Rose School (students moved to Highlands School when it became a K-9 School)
Mount Royal School (students moved to Highlands School when it became a K-9 School)
Newton School (now houses School Service Teams providing support to District schools and schools in the Edmonton region, in relation extra supports and services for students with individualized needs)
Parkdale School (leased by Bent Arrow Traditional Healing Society)
Queen Mary Park School (leased by the Francophone School Division)
R. J. Scott School (houses Inclusive Learning staff)
Rundle School (Ivor Dent School replaced this school in 2017. The building now houses Metro Continuing Education and is leased by Beverley Day Care Society & Family Resource Centre and Vineyard Christian Fellowships of Edmonton)
Sherbrooke School (now the Aurora Charter School)
Westlawn School (demolished, replaced by Alex Janvier school)
Woodcroft School (now the Edmonton Public Schools' Institute for Innovation in Second Language Education [IISLE])

Programs
Edmonton Public Schools offers Regular programs, Alternative programs and Special education programs.

Special education programs are available at select schools and include programs for students who are academically advanced, and students who have Behaviour Disabilities, Cognitive Disabilities, Diagnosed Learning Disabilities and Academic Delays.

There are more than 30 Alternative programs available with a focus on a specific type of arts, athletics, language, faith, culture or teaching philosophy. This includes: Aboriginal education, Cogito, American Sign Language, Hockey Training, Waldorf and the International Baccalaureate Diploma Program.

Early Years Programming

Early Education
This program supports children with mild/moderate and severe disabilities, aged  to  years. Programming focuses on cognitive, self-help and social skills, speech and language, and motor development. Parents and staff work together to support each child.

Early Learning
This program supports children  to  years of age who are English Language Learners or in need of specialized supports and services. Programming focuses on developing communication and co-operative learning skills, and is available to children attending their designated school.

Kindergarten
Children who are four years of age on or before March 1 of that year, may register in Kindergarten for the upcoming school year. Children may attend their designated school or apply to a school or program of choice. Kindergarten is offered half-day in the mornings or afternoons at most elementary schools, and full-day at some elementary schools for children living in the designated attendance area.

Advanced Education Programs

Challenge Program [K-9]
For children who have high academic standards. This program is formatted to make the learning more challenging and focuses on problem solving and inquiry skills.

Extensions Program [1-9]
This program is for children with advanced intellectual abilities. These students enjoy being challenged, grasp new ideas easily, and perform far beyond their current grade level.

Academic Delay Programs

Literacy Program [4-9]
This program is for children for academic delays. This program focuses on literacy and numeracy.

Strategies Program [4-9]
This program is for children who have diagnosed learning disabilities and a high cognitive ability. It focuses on assisting students who need extra help.

Cognitive Disabilities Programs

Opportunity Program [1-12]
This program assists students with mild cognitive disabilities who experience significant academic and social challenges. Programming focuses on literacy, numeracy and skills necessary for responsible independent living and employment.

Community Learning Skills Program [1-12]
This program assists students with moderate cognitive disabilities. Programming focuses on assisting students to gain the independent life skills necessary for supervised living and employment.

Individual Support Program [1-12]
This program assists students with severe to profound cognitive delays, including physical, sensory or behaviour disabilities. The program is designed to enhance quality of life for students and emphasizes functional life skills development.

Behavior Programs

Behavior and Learning Assistance Program [1-9]
This program assists students with severe behaviour disabilities. Programming focuses on helping students make academic gains, learn socially acceptable behaviour and develop appropriate social skills in the classroom and community.

Behavior Learning Assistance/Opportunity Program [1-9]
This program assists students with both severe behaviour and mild cognitive disabilities. Programming focuses on helping students to learn behaviour control and the pro-social, literacy and numeracy skills necessary for independence in the community.

Community Learning and Behaviour Skills Program [1-9]
This program assists students with both moderate cognitive and severe behaviour disabilities. Programming focuses on helping students manage with their social, emotional and academic challenges.

Other District Centre Programs

Interactions Program [1-12]
This program assists students who have been clinically diagnosed within the autism spectrum. Programming focuses on assisting students to gain socially appropriate communication and behaviour patterns in the classroom and community.

Deaf and Hard Of Hearing Program [1-12]
This program assists students who have a moderate to profound hearing loss. Programming focuses on helping students gain communication skills and strategies necessary to complete school and access secondary education or employment.

Bilingual and Immersion Language Programs
American Sign Language Bilingual
Arabic Bilingual
Chinese (Mandarin) Bilingual
French Immersion
Late French Immersion (starting in Grade 7)
German Bilingual
Hebrew Bilingual
International Spanish Academy

Second Language Courses
Arabic
American Sign Language (ASL)
Chinese
Cree
English as second language (ESL)
French
German
Japanese
Punjabi
Spanish
Ukrainian

All students from grades 4-9 must learn a second language.

Alternative Programs
Aboriginal Education - Amiskwaciy Academy 
Awasis (Cree) 
Cree Extended 
Academic Alternative 
Advanced Placement 
Arts Core 
Caraway 
Child Study Centre 
Cogito 
Dance Program 
Edmonton Christian School 
Logos Christian Program Schools 
Meadowlark Christian School 
Millwoods Christian School 
Sports Training Programs
Hockey Training Program
Lacrosse Training Program 
Soccer Training Program 
Sport Recreation Program 
Sports Alternative 
International Baccalaureate Certificate
International Baccalaureate Career-Related
International Baccalaureate Diploma 
International Baccalaureate Middle Years 
International Baccalaureate Primary Years
Pre-Advanced Placement 
Sakinah Circle 
Science Alternative 
Victoria School Of Performing And Visual Arts
Traditional

See also
List of school authorities in Alberta
Edmonton Catholic School District

References

External links
Edmonton Public Schools' official website

School districts in Alberta
Education in Edmonton